Sun-Herald may refer to:

 The Sun-Herald, the Sunday edition of The Sydney Morning Herald, a newspaper based in Sydney, Australia
 Sun Herald, a newspaper based in Biloxi, Mississippi

See also
 Herald Sun, in Melbourne, Australia
 The Herald-Sun, in Durham, North Carolina